Krid or KRID may refer to:
 
Krid (DJ), one of the known names of Finnish disc jockey DJ Kridlokk
Mohamed Krid, Tunisian Paralympian athlete
KZKY, American radio station formerly using call sign KRID